Eilema borbonica is a moth of the subfamily Arctiinae. It is endemic to Réunion.

References

Moths described in 2011
borbonica
Moths of Africa